Graham Bassett Dadds (16 March 1911 – 8 March 1980) was a British field hockey player who competed in the 1952 Summer Olympics.

He was a member of the British field hockey team, which won the bronze medal. He played one match as goalkeeper.

External links
 
profile

1911 births
1980 deaths
British male field hockey players
Olympic field hockey players of Great Britain
Field hockey players at the 1952 Summer Olympics
Olympic bronze medallists for Great Britain
Olympic medalists in field hockey
Medalists at the 1952 Summer Olympics